Remnant fellowships are a loosely organized branch of the Latter Day Saint movement formed by individuals who accept alleged divine revelations received by Denver Snuffer Jr. (an attorney excommunicated from the LDS Church in 2013). The Remnant Fellowships generally feel called to personal and social renewal preparatory to Christ's eventual second coming. According to movement beliefs, participants anticipate a coming time when remnants remain within the full restored covenant with Jesus Christ: an allusion to a belief that "The Bible, Book of Mormon, and modern revelation through the Prophet Joseph Smith, prophesy that the gospel of Jesus Christ would shift from the Gentile stewards of the gospel back to Israel in the last days." The movement places a renewed focus on individual communion with God, gifts of the spirit, tangible expressions of faith, and the eventual establishment of Zion. While the movement has no official name, the term "Snufferite" has been used to denote followers. Other designations include covenant of Christ movement and Denver Snuffer movement. Participants sometimes reference each other as "covenant Brother," "covenant Sister" (abbreviated "cov bruv/sis").

Participants are Mormon dissidents and supra-denominational Christians. Its individual fellowships are autonomous and lack affiliation with or oversight from the Church of Jesus Christ of Latter-day Saints (LDS church).

Origins
Denver Snuffer, Jr. released a series of books and online articles explaining his beliefs and interpretations of scripture. He had said his writings were intended to promote loyalty to the Church of Jesus Christ of Latter-day Saints and that he would not be instrumental in starting a new religion. Snuffer's writings provoked a response from LDS leaders who eventually excommunicated him for what they described as directly challenging key doctrines. In 2014, Snuffer said he received a revelation informing him that "the Lord terminated the priesthood authority" of LDS church leadership involved in his excommunication, such as the LDS First Presidency. Starting in 2013, grass-roots fellowships formed, inspired by Snuffer's teachings and thus in schism with mainstream Mormonism. On February 17–19, 2017, a proposed set of governing principles was presented to these fellowships by Jeff Savage. As of 2017, the movement included approximately 5,000 adherents worldwide. Since 2016, about forty fellowships are affiliated with the movement.

Adherents gather in conferences, beginning in 2016. At the 2017 conference, Snuffer-inspired teachings were canonized as holy scripture. This canon consists of a reworking of scripture from the mainstream LDS Church, such as the Book of Mormon, as well as Snuffer's expanded translation of the Book of John and several of Snuffer's revelations. The movement de-emphasizes hierarchy and organization, with some fellowships (for example, the movement's Minnesota fellowship) asserting they possess no leadership.

The fellowships draw largely from members and former members of the LDS Church, leading LDS authorities to identify Snuffer and his teachings as a vehicle for leading people out of that church. In 2017, the website MormonLeaks published a PowerPoint presentation shown in 2015 to the LDS Quorum of the Twelve Apostles, in which Snuffer was identified as one of 17 "Issues and Ideas Leading People Away" from mainstream LDS doctrine.

Conferences
The general conferences organized by movement fellowships are listed below.

Doctrine of Christ Conference, Boise, Idaho, September 9–11, 2016
Doctrine of Christ Conference, St. George, Utah, March 18–20, 2017
Covenant of Christ Conference, Boise, Idaho, September 2–3, 2017

This conference voted on the canonization of scripture, and discussed the building of a temple. Some followers of the movement refer to themselves as the Remnant.

Wisdom through the Ages Conference, Phoenix, Arizona, March 24–25, 2018
Preserving the Hope of Zion Conference, Layton, Utah, September 29–30, 2018
A Hope in Christ: The Temple Conference, Grand Junction, Colorado, April 20–21, 2019
Keeping the Covenant Conference, Boise, Idaho, September 20–22, 2019
The Heavens Are Open Conference, Hurricane, Utah, March 20–22, 2020
The Religion of the Fathers Conference, Aravada Springs, Nevada, March 26–29, 2021
Hear and Trust the Lord in the Storm, Lexington, Kentucky, March 25–27, 2022

Beliefs and practices 

According to Snuffer's exegesis of LDS Scripture, the present Gospel dispensation, as restored through Joseph Smith (especially the LDS Church), has ended and a new Gospel dispensation has opened.

As Scripturally foretold, remnants especially of indigenous peoples of the Americas will adopt Christ's covenant in these Last Days (these indigenous remnants are likely of mixed-blooded; in Mormon belief, such individuals are considered among components of the house of Israel). The present period is of a time of the Lord calling out those to transition between the dispensation that resulted in the establishment of the Church of Christ through Smith and this next, foretold dispensation of Israel.

With regard to the 1844 succession crisis within Mormonism after the murder of Joseph Smith, the Snuffer movement holds beliefs similar to the Reorganized Church of Jesus Christ of Latter Day Saints (RLDS), namely that Brigham Young, who ultimately took leadership of the largest portion Smith's followers, was in apostasy from Smith's teachings. The movement rejects Young's assertions to possess authority to fill the position held by Smith. The movement agrees with mainstream LDS in rejection of Young's theological innovations such as Young's attempt to formulate his Adam God theory. The movement goes further and rejects any doctrinal innovations by Young.

Most in the movement agree with a foundational belief among the RLDS (now called Community of Christ) that Joseph Smith did not practice plural marriage and this innovation was promulgated by Young.

Unlike either the LDS or RLDS, movement believers hold that spiritual authority to perform certain gospel ordinances as restored through Smith passed from the earth at Smith's death. Movement adherents believe LDS Church apostles and some others have retained "keys" to baptize but do not possess the keys necessary for greater works.

The fellowships believe Smith taught that the Last Days covenant people should forswear allegiance to any institution but to enact the same to each individual's own covenants and to Smith's open canon of scripture. (Compare these movement beliefs with some of the aspects of Sola Scriptura, which the doctrinal foundation of Protestantism especially within its Calvinistical and Lutheran variations. In this respect, movement beliefs perhaps occupy some ground between LDS-style Mormonism institutional authoritarianism and individual conscience-privileging Nonconformist Protestantism.)

"I believe that the many revelations in the D&C identifying Joseph as the spokesman for God means exactly that: Joseph was and IS the spokesman God sent. Joseph's words need to be heeded as if they came from God directly to us. No one has the right to change or ignore them. No one (and I mean NO ONE) has the right to claim they are Joseph's equal. There are no "keys" or "key holders" who can alter Joseph's teachings except at their peril. When they ignore or contradict Joseph's revelations, and teach others that they can ignore the message and warnings given by that prophet who was called by God to begin this dispensation, they damn themselves and any who listen to them."—Denver Snuffer, September 25, 2013

The movement is supra-denominational Christian. It teaches belief in Christ, initial baptism or re-baptism by authorized movement brethren in living water, receiving of the Holy Ghost, and acceptance of the movement's scriptural canon as prerequisites for participation. Beyond these basics, participants' beliefs vary amongst themselves.

Movement adherents believe in the doctrine taught by Joseph Smith in 1839 of the Second Comforter.<blockquote>"After a person has faith in Christ, repents of his sins, and is baptized for the remission of his sins and receives the Holy Ghost (by the laying on of hands), which is the first Comforter, then let him continue to humble himself before God, hungering and thirsting after righteousness, and living by every word of God, and the Lord will soon say unto him, Son, thou shalt be exalted. When the Lord has thoroughly proved him, and finds that the man is determined to serve Him at all hazards, then the man will find his calling and his election made sure, then it will be his privilege to receive the other Comforter, which the Lord hath promised the Saints, as is recorded in the testimony of St. John, in the 14th chapter, from the 12th to the 27th verses….</p>"Now what is this other Comforter? It is no more nor less than the Lord Jesus Christ Himself; …when any man obtains this last Comforter, he will have the personage of Jesus Christ to attend him, or appear unto him from time to time, and even He will manifest the Father unto him, and they will take up their abode with him, and the visions of the heavens will be opened unto him, and the Lord will teach him face to face, and he may have a perfect knowledge of the mysteries of the Kingdom of God; and this is the state and place the ancient Saints arrived at when they had such glorious visions-Isaiah, Ezekiel, John upon the Isle of Patmos, St. Paul in the three heavens, and all the Saints who held communion with the general assembly and Church of the First Born [TPJS, pp. 150-51]."The Lord has counseled his Saints to "seek his face" (D&C 101:37-38). No sinful person can endure his presence, and hence will not obtain the blessing (D&C 67:10-13; JST Ex. 33:11, 20). In God's wisdom, some faithful individuals are blessed with the Second Comforter while remaining in mortality."[See also Calling and Election; Jesus Christ: Latter-Day Appearances of Jesus Christ.]— </blockquote>

Fellowships include participants who are current or former Latter-day Saints, Community of Christ (or other groups within the "Reorganized" tradition founded by Smith's son Joseph Smith III), fundamentalist Mormon denominations, Catholics, or Protestants. Fellowship participants need not leave their former faith, whether this be Christian or another faith.

Fellowships meet at homes or outdoors. (Its baptisms "in living waters" entails meetings along streams.) According to some in the Snuffer movement the divine command through Smith to build the temple in Nauvoo, Illinois for "endowment" rites having been inadequately fulfilled. Movement believers are consecrating funds toward building a temple of Zion, which they believe the Lord eventually will command for a Zion people to build.

Denver Snuffer teaches that Mary, the mother of Jesus, is Heavenly Father's wife and the Heavenly Mother of the spirits of all human beings.

Scriptures

(Joseph Smith's New Translation of the Old Testament)

(Joseph Smith's New Translation of the New Testament & Joseph Smith's self-revised version of the Book of Mormon)
 

Teachings and Commandments include —
 (possibly) proverbs of Joseph Smith
 (possibly) proverbs of Denver Snuffer Jr.
 "D. & C." sections by Joseph Smith
 a new version of D&C 54
 exclusion of Kirtland Temple visitation by angels in D&C 110 and portions based on fragmentary teachings by Joseph Smith in D&C 129
 letter from Hyrum Smith as section 97,
 Lectures on Faith
 the Wentworth Letter
 (possibly) "a newly revealed account of John the Beloved’s Testimony of Jesus the Messiah"
 revelations given to Denver Snuffer Jr. 
 the movement's "Guide and Standard"

Reactions
In 2013, a critical review by Gregory L. Smith of Snuffer's Passing the Heavenly Gift was published in Interpreter: A Journal of Mormon Scripture. Smith responds to Snuffer's belief that "the Latter-day Saint church was predicted to fail, and in all likelihood has failed to secure the fullness of the priesthood" by Smith's contention that the book contains various "false statements and conclusions, contains errors, and makes mistakes in history."

In 2013, Snuffer was informed by his Sandy Utah Crescent Stake president in a letter that the thesis of Passing the Heavenly Gift, soon to be published,  was "in direct conflict with LDS Church doctrine" and unless Snuffer would withdraw it from publication he could be subject to church discipline for "apostasy." After the book's  publication, Snuffer was excommunicated from the LDS Church.

In 2015, "A Response to Denver Snuffer’s Essay on Plural Marriage, Adoption, and the Supposed Falling Away of the Church," by Brian C. Hales was published in Interpreter. Hales says that Snuffer's status as revelator is not unique, citing such Latter Day Saint movement revelators over the years as Lorin C. Woolley, John T. Clark, Maurice Glendening, Leroy Wilson, Joseph W. Musser, Elden Kingston, Ben LeBaron, Gerald Peterson, James D. Harmston, Brian David Mitchell, Robert C. Crossfield, and Addam Swapp, who, akin to Snuffer, believe the mainstream LDS Church is in apostasy.

In a June 2015 three-stake fireside (which some colloquially term the "Boise (Idaho) Rescue"), featured LDS devotional addresses by LDS Apostle Dallin H. Oaks and Church Historian Richard E. Turley Jr. "We sometimes hear is that the church is no longer the church that was restored to the earth by the prophet Joseph," Turley said. "Here’s another claim: the church is focused on following the brethren instead of seeking Christ," said Oaks; "When you start toward apostasy, you are on the wrong side. [...] Stand fast with the leadership of the church." Snuffer said to KUTV news that soon before the fireside event, Remnant movement re-baptisms of LDS individuals had been performed in the area.

An internal 2015 PowerPoint chart prepared for LDS Apostles (and later provided to news outlets by the MormonLeaks organization) lists Snuffer, the Ordain Women advocacy movement, and new media journalist social commentator John Dehlin among entities leading some LDS Church members away from fellowship with the denomination.

According to religion reporter Peggy Fletcher Stack, when LDS Apostle M. Russell Ballard spoke at the LDS October 2017 General Conference, giving warning that LDS faithful not to be deceived by non-LDS priesthood holders or "organizations, groups or individuals [...claiming] secret answers to doctrinal questions", his characterizations fit "the nascent Remnant movement".

In October 2017, Jeff Savage was excommunicated from the LDS Church for apostasy.

See also
 Continuing revelation
 Gifts of the Spirit in Mormonism
 Leaderless resistance

Notes

External links
 FellowshipLocator.Info, a website affiliated with the Remnant movement
 
 

2013 establishments
Latter Day Saint denominations
Christian organizations established in 2013
Mormonism-related controversies
Christian denominations established in the 21st century
Latter Day Saint movement in the United States